Rana Lakha (1382 – 1421) was a king belonging to the Sisodia lineage of Mewar in present-day state of Rajasthan. He was the son of Maharana Kshetra Singh and ruled from 1382 until his death in 1421.

Lakha was married several times and had at least eight sons. His son Mokal Singh by his wife Hansa Bai of Mandore (now in Jodhpur) became the fourth Maharana in 1421. During his reign, Lakha took the remaining Mewar territories from Delhi. His eldest son Chunda took oath to safeguard his motherland against all external powers who were trying to overpower the Mewar state in the exchange of his father's marriage to Rani Hansa Bai. After having some misunderstanding with Rani Hansa Bai and Rao Ranmal (brother of Rani Hansa Bai) Rana Chunda left the Chittorgarh fort and went to fort Begu in Chittorgarh district and ruled there himself. The followers of Chunda are known as Chundawats.

Rule
Rana Lakha Singh was one of the most successful Maharana's. He extended his dominions by the subjugation of Marwar and the destruction of its chief stronghold, Berahtgarh, on the ruins of which he founded Badnore. It was in this time that the tins and silver Mines of Jawar were discovered in the country conquered from the bhils by his father. Rana Lakha raided as far as Gaya in Bihar and put an end to pilgrimage tax there. With the revenues thus augmented he rebuilt the palaces and temples destroyed by Alauddin Khilji, excavated reservoirs and lakes, raised immense ramparts to dam their waters, and constructed a number of forts. He conquered the Sankhla Rajputs of Shekhawati (Nagarchal territory) and like his father, he defeated the imperial army of Delhi led by Sultan Firoz Shah Tughlaq  at Badnor.

References 

  
 

Mewar dynasty
1421 deaths
Year of birth unknown
Rajput rulers
Hindu monarchs